Deng Xiaogang (born August 1967) is a Chinese politician, serving since 2017 as the Deputy Communist Party Secretary of Sichuan. He began his political career in Beijing, then moved to the Tibet Autonomous Region (TAR), where he served as deputy party chief and secretary of its Political and Legal Affairs Commission.

Biography
Deng was born in Guiyang County, Hunan province. He graduated with a degree in animal husbandry from Hunan College of Agriculture (now Hunan Agricultural University), and a graduate degree in development economics from the Beijing Agricultural University (now China Agricultural University). He joined the Communist Party of China in December 1991. He worked in the Beijing Planning Commission, the Beijing Development and Reform Commission, and the deputy governor of Fengtai District, and the governor of Tongzhou District.

In 2005, Deng was selected to work in Tibet. In June 2005 he became assistant to the Chairman of the Tibet Autonomous Region, then in 2006 was elevated to Vice Chairman, entering sub-provincial ranks at only age 39. He entered the regional Party Standing Committee in 2011 as the secretary-general of the regional party committee. In April 2012, as part of a wider reshuffle, Deng was named head of the TAR Political and Legal Affairs Commission (Zhengfawei), the youngest provincial-level Zhengfawei chief at the time. In April 2013 he was named Deputy Party Secretary of the Tibet Autonomous Region. In March 2017, Deng was transferred to Sichuan province to serve as deputy party chief there. At the time of his transfer, Deng, 48, was the youngest provincial-level party chief in the country.

References

1967 births
Living people
Politicians from Chenzhou
Political office-holders in Sichuan
Political office-holders in Tibet
People's Republic of China politicians from Hunan
Hunan Agricultural University alumni